Ramany vs Ramany 3.0 is an Indian Tamil-language sitcom Comedy web series, produced as an Original for Aha Tamil, directed by Naga. Produced by Kavithalayaa Productions the series stars Vasuki Anand and Ram G in the lead role along with Poovilangu Mohan, Ponni Suresh, Param Guhanesh and Vaidyanathan Padmanabhan. It is a third season of the 1998 Tamil series Ramany vs Ramany. The series premiered on Aha Tamil on 4 March 2022.

Cast
 Ram G as Mr. Ramany
 Vasuki Anand as Mrs. Ramany
 Ponni Suresh as Ramanys' daughter Ragini
 Param Guhanesh as Ramanys' son Ram
 Poovilangu Mohan as Mr. ramany's father
 Vaidyanathan Padmanabhan as Mrs. Ramany's father
 K. Sathyamurthy
 Sriram Krish
 Sudha Pushpa
 Suchitra Ravi
 Elakiya
 Narmadha Veni
C. Ranganathan as Mr. Ramany's uncle (episode 9 Unwanted guest)

Production

Casting
Vasuki from the first season and Ram G from the second season will be paired as the Ramanys in the third season. Ponni Suresh and Param Ganesh was cast as the daughter and son respectively the comic couple. Devadarshini will not reprise her role from season 2 for the third season.

References

External links 

Aha (streaming service) original programming
Tamil-language web series
2022 Tamil-language television series debuts
Tamil-language comedy television series